Alexey Lvovich Popov (July 13, 1974 in Moscow) is a Russian journalist and TV commentator best known as a commentator on Formula 1 racing.

Biography 
His first Formula 1 race Popov saw in 1988 in Belgium - his grandfather worked in the Trade Mission of the USSR. Career as a journalist he began in 1991 in the newspaper Sport Express. Later he wrote many books, including, magazine   Formula +, Autosport,  Grand Prix,  F1Life, the newspaper Soviet Sport.

He began race commentary in 1992 on the TV channel Russia 1.

In the same year he became a member of the company Samipa (Monaco), which owned the television rights to broadcast Formula 1 races in the former USSR. Then he moved to Monaco where he did the production of Chrono TV program. At that time, he was commenting CART and NASCAR races on the French TV channel AB Moteurs. Since 1996, he resumed working on Russian television.

Was nominated for TEFI award in 2000, but lost it to Vladimir Maslachenko.

In 2005, 2009 and 2011-2012, Popov led channel Russia 2 program Grand Prix with Alexey Popov.

Popov is often called Russian voice of Formula 1.

Since February 2007 to May 2013 - the permanent presenter of the Week of sports, led it in turn with Dmitry Guberniev.

Since November 2015 he works on Match TV channel.

He speaks many European languages: French, Italian, Spanish, Portuguese, English and others, in varying degrees.

Personal life 
Divorced, he has three children from two prior marriages. His first wife is French, and the mother of two sons.

Work on Russian television 
1992 —  RTR
1996 —  RTR
1997-1999 —  TV Centr
2000-2002 —   RTR 
2002-2005 —  Russia 1 and Russia 2
2006 —  REN TV
2007-2009 —  Russia 2
 2010-2015 —   Russia 2 and Sport-1
 November 1, 2015 – present —  Match TV

References

External links
 
 Блог на сайте телеканала «Спорт» 
 Кикнадзе: Алексей Попов — это реальный мотор (championat.com, 25 марта 2009 года)

1974 births
Living people
Sports commentators
Russian sports journalists
Formula One journalists and reporters
Russian television presenters